Ekstraliga is the highest league in the league system of Polish floorball and comprises the top 8 Polish floorball teams. The league was founded as I liga mężczyzn in 1997 by the Polish Floorball Federation (PZU). It was renamed to Ekstraliga for the 2009–10 season. The season ends with a play-off and a final.

The champion of the league is eligible to compete at the EuroFloorball Cup.

Format

Regular season

The regular season is played in a round robin format with each team playing 14 games. The total number of regular season games is 56. The four teams that finish the regular season at the top of the standings qualify for the playoffs in the spring.

Playoffs

The top eight teams from the regular season play for the Polish Champion. The first placed team from the regular season plays with fourth, the second placed team plays with third. The playoffs are played in best-of-three format.

Teams 

Teams in 2021/22 season:

Champions 
List of champions in seasons of the league:

 1998 – Dajar's Team Warszawa
 1999 – Podhale Nowy Targ
 2000 – KS Szarotka Nowy Targ
 2001 – KS Szarotka Nowy Targ
 2002 – KS Szarotka Nowy Targ
 2003 – KS Szarotka Nowy Targ
 2004 – KS Szarotka Nowy Targ
 2005 – KS Szarotka Nowy Targ
 2006 – KS Szarotka Nowy Targ
 2007 – KS Szarotka Nowy Targ
 2008 – KS Szarotka Nowy Targ
 2009 – KS Szarotka Nowy Targ
 2010 – KS Szarotka Nowy Targ
 2011 – KS Górale Nowy Targ
 2012 – KS Górale Nowy Targ
 2013 – KS Górale Nowy Targ
 2014 – UKS Bankówka Zielonka
 2015 – KS Górale Nowy Targ
 2016 – KS Górale Nowy Targ
 2017 – UKS Bankówka Zielonka
 2018 – KS Górale Nowy Targ
 2019 – KS Górale Nowy Targ
 2020 – KS Górale Nowy Targ
 2021 – UKS Bankówka Zielonka
 2022 – UKS Bankówka Zielonka

General classification

Titles

References

External links 
 Official website
 Polski Związek Unihokeja

Floorball competitions in Poland
Sports leagues in Poland
1997 establishments in Poland
Sports leagues established in 1997